Angorichina is a pastoral lease,  in area, in the Flinders Ranges in the Australian state of South Australia.

Angorichina Station
The lease was first taken up by Septimus Boord in 1853. In 1859, the property was visited by the surveyors Selwyn and Goyder and by the Governor of South Australia, Richard MacDonnell. Later the same year a shepherd on Angorichina Station, Robert Blinman, first discovered copper and took out a mining lease which later became the Blinman mine.

Walter Henry McFarlane acquired Angorichina in the early 1920s after disposing of Warrioota Station. In 1941 the  property was carrying a flock of 38,000 sheep that produced 1300 bales of wool.

, Angorichina Station was still a working sheep station, covering hills, creek beds, gorges and saltbush.

Blinman

Blinman, the small township within the pastoral lease had a population, in 2016, of 35.

Angorichina Village
The site was originally established in 1927 as Angorichina Hostel by the Tubercular Soldiers Association as a sanatorium for returned servicemen of World War I.

See also
List of ranches and stations

References

Flinders Ranges
Stations (Australian agriculture)
Pastoral leases in South Australia
Far North (South Australia)